Sitili Tupouniua (born 30 May 1997) is a Tonga international rugby league footballer who plays as a  forward for the Sydney Roosters in the NRL.

Background
Tupouniua was born in Auckland, New Zealand, and is of Tongan descent.

Tupouniua played his junior rugby league for the Marist Saints. He played in the Sydney Roosters’ Holden Cup side from 2016-2017, including in the Sydney Roosters’ 2016 Holden Cup premiership winning team.

Playing career

2018
Tupouniua made his first grade debut for the Sydney Roosters in round 16 of the 2018 NRL season against the Melbourne Storm at Adelaide Oval.

2019
Tupouniua scored his first try in the top grade against Canterbury-Bankstown in round 14 of the 2019 NRL season at the Sydney Cricket Ground.

Tupouniua featured for North Sydney, the Sydney Roosters feeder club in the 2019 Canterbury Cup NSW finals series.  Tupouniua scored 2 tries in North Sydney's elimination final defeat by Newtown at Leichhardt Oval.

2020
Tupouniua scored his first try of the 2020 NRL season in round 9 as the Sydney Roosters defeated North Queensland 42–16 at Queensland Country Bank Stadium.

In round 16 of the 2020 NRL season, he scored two tries for the Roosters in a 58–12 victory over Brisbane at the Sydney Cricket Ground.

He made a total of 20 appearances in the 2020 NRL season as the Sydney Roosters reached the finals but were eliminated by Canberra ending their quest for a third straight premiership.

In December 2020, he signed a contract extension keeping him with the Sydney Roosters until the end of the 2024 season.

2021
In round 10 of the 2021 NRL season, he was sent to the sin bin for an illegal high tackle during the club's 30-16 victory over North Queensland.

In round 12 of the 2021 NRL season, he scored two tries in a 44-16 victory over Canberra.

In round 19, he scored two tries during the club's victory over Newcastle.

In round 24, he was sent to the sin bin during the club's 54-12 loss against arch-rivals South Sydney.

He played a total of 24 games for the Sydney Roosters in the 2021 NRL season including the club's two finals matches.  The Sydney Roosters were eliminated from the second week of the finals losing to Manly 42-6.

2022
In round 18 of the 2022 NRL season, Tupouniua was taken from the field during the Sydney Roosters 54-26 victory over St. George Illawarra with a knee injury. 
It was later announced that Tupounia would miss the remainder of the 2022 NRL season with an ACL injury.

References

External links
Roosters profile

1997 births
Living people
New Zealand sportspeople of Tongan descent
New Zealand rugby league players
North Sydney Bears NSW Cup players
Rugby league second-rows
Sydney Roosters players
Tonga national rugby league team players
Rugby league players from Auckland